Elizabeth Eggleston Seelye (December 15, 1858 - November 11, 1923) was an American writer and biographer. Her story "The A.O.I.B.R.", which appeared in Harper's Bazaar in 1889 with an illustration of a child reading, is cited by the Rockwell Centre for American Visual Studies as a surprisingly early illustration of a girl reading. Allegra Eggleston (Seelye's sister) and Rosina Emmet Sherwood provided illustrations for Seelye's stories.

Early years and education

Elizabeth Craig Eggleston was born in Saint Paul, Minnesota, Minnesota, December 15, 1858. She was a daughter of Edward Eggleston, the novelist. Her mother, Elizabeth, was of English parentage and of a family with talent for graphic art. Seelye early showed the "book hunger" that characterized members of her family. In 1866, the family removed to Evanston, Illinois, where her father had built one of the earliest kindergartens in America where his children might "be trained".

After they moved to Brooklyn, New York, in 1870, Seelye attended Packer Collegiate Institute, but with her parents dissatisfied, she and her sister were soon taught at home by private teachers. She also was the only child to attend adult classes in French and German at the Brooklyn Mercantile Library.

Career
Her love of reading was illustrated in her writing. Her story "The A.O.I.B.R." appeared in Harper's Bazaar in 1889 with an illustration of a child reading. The Rockwell Centre for American Visual Studies cites this as a surprisingly early illustration of a girl reading. The subject of girls reading in the illustration by Rosina Emmet Sherwood is thought rare (like the  ones in Louisa May Alcott's Little Women).

As an adult, she read works of philosophy, natural science and political economy. Her study of the literature of the Middle English period enabled her to supply the editor of the Century Dictionary with 500 new words and definitions. She wrote four of the five volumes in the Famous American Indian Series, Tecumseh (New York, 1878); Pocahontas (New York, 1879); Brant and Red Jacket (New York, 1879), and Montezuma (New York, 1880). Seelye also published The Story of Columbus (New York, 1892), illustrated by her sister, Allegra Eggleston.

Personal life
In 1877, she married Elwyn Seelye, and since that time, lived on or near Lake George, New York.
Seelye was the mother of six children: Allegra (b. 1878), Blanche (b. 1882), Elwyn (b. 1884), Edward (b. 1888), Cynthia (b. 1888) and Elizabeth (b. 1893). She died November 11, 1923, in Philadelphia, Pennsylvania.

Selected works
 Tecumseh and the Shawnee Prophet, 1878
 Brant and Red Jacket, 1879
 Montezuma and the conquest of Mexico, 1880 
 The Indian Princess; or, the Story of Pocahontas, 1881
 The Story of Columbus, 1892
 Story of Washington, 1893
 Lake George in history, 1897
 Saratoga and Lake Champlain in history, 1898

References

Attribution

Bibliography

External links
 
 

1858 births
1923 deaths
Writers from Saint Paul, Minnesota
19th-century American historians
19th-century American women writers
American women historians
American biographers
American women biographers